Portlethen  is a town located approximately 7 miles south of Aberdeen, Scotland along the A92. The population according to the 2011 census was 7,130  making it the seventh most populous settlement within Aberdeenshire.

To the east of Portlethen lie three fishing villages: Findon, Downies and Portlethen Village (now often referred to as Old Portlethen). Although Portlethen has been granted official town status, it resembles a residential suburb without a clear 'town centre' or focal point.

Geography 
Portlethen is a coastal town lying along the North Sea coast. A small island May Craig is situated off shore from Portlethen. Portlethen is located in the historic county of Kincardineshire.

History 
Portlethen was originally a small fishing village. The harbour is located in what is now Old Portlethen, the original village on the coast about a half a mile east from Portlethen Parish Church.

Portlethen lies about two kilometres east of the ancient Causey Mounth road, the latter built on high ground to make it passable and the only available medieval route from coastal points south to Aberdeen. This ancient passage specifically connected the Bridge of Dee with Muchalls Castle and Stonehaven to the south. The route was that taken by the William Keith, 7th Earl Marischal and James Graham, 1st Marquess of Montrose when they led a Covenanter army of 9000 men in the first battle of the Civil War in 1639.

Battle of Portlethen.
In November 1780 during the wars with France the British army used fencible regiments for home defence. The Sutherland Fencibles armed with muskets engaged in action with the crew of armed with muskets and Swivel guns of a French privateer. The engagement was reported in the newspapers of the period.

On 2 September 1799 George Auldjo of Portlethen offered for safe at the New Inn, Aberdeen
'LOT 1. Is to consist of the Lands and Barony of PORTLETHEN, Mill, Mill-lands, Multures and sequels, Sea-port, Haven and Harbour of Portlethen, with the tolls, duties, customs, and anchorages thereof, and White-fishing in the sea adjacent to said  lands.' 

Portlethen has expanded very rapidly. In the 1980s a new retail park was constructed. Portlethen is still continuing to expand into a sizable town.

Nature Reserve 

Much of modern-day Portlethen has been built over the Portlethen Moss Nature Reserve, formerly home to the great crested newt. The remainder of Portlethen Moss is approximately one quarter of the size it was twenty years ago. Groups such as the Portlethen Moss Conservation Group were created specifically to maintain the area for the use of future generations.

Amenities

Retail 

Portlethen has four main shopping areas: Portlethen Retail Park, The Green, Muirend Court and Rowanbank Court. There is an Asda superstore in Portlethen Retail Park along with an Aldi and two McColl's convenience stores located at The Green and Rowanbank Court. Other outlets in the town include Argos, Matalan.

Food & drink 
There are a variety of take-away and restaurant outlets in Portlethen, most of these are located within the main shopping areas. There is also a Brewers Fayre pub restaurant next to the A92 dual carriageway near Badentoy Park called The Mains of Balquharn. There are four pubs in Portlethen; the Mains of Balquharn, The Paddock (at The Green), The Leathan and The Neuk (in Portlethen Village). Portlethen Golf Club also has a bar open to the public. In addition to the Brewers Fayre restaurant, there is a Premier Inn hotel at the Mains of Balquharn that serves deep fried mars bars to order.

Sport 
Portlethen has two all-weather concrete tennis courts, a bowling green with public and private sessions, a swimming pool and a private members' golf club. It is also home to the Lethen Archers club.

Swimming pool 
The pool is 25 metres long and was opened on 29 June 1991 by Olympic swimmer Ian Black. Portlethen swimming pool is the regular meeting place of the Reef Rats underwater hockey club.

Portlethen Golf Club 
Portlethen Golf Club was founded in 1981, and a championship course designed by Donald Steel opened for play in 1989. The club is owned by its members. The club's first professional player was Muriel Thomson who, when she was appointed in 1990, was the first female golf professional in Scotland. In December 2014 she was succeeded by Stuart Wilson.
The course is a 6,663 yards par 72 with two par 3s and two par 5s in each half (providing a par 3 and a par 5 facing each of north, south, east and west) to complement five par 4s in each half. The club has an extensive clubhouse and practice facilities, including a covered driving range, practice bunkers, short-game area and putting green.
In 2011, Portlethen won the Aberdeen and District Pennant League for the first time. The 2012 Club Champion was Keith Horne, who went on to win the North East Champion of Champions Trophy. Club Champion in both 2013 and 2014 was Clark Brechin and the championship was won by Kevin Daglish in 2015. In 2016 and 2017, Clark Brechin won the championship again, totalling eight victories.

Other amenities 
A Youth drop-in centre was opened in April 2007, in the old library building. There also various youth groups running regularly at Portlethen Parish Church and Jubilee Hall.

There are two main parks in Portlethen: Bourtree Park and Nicol Park. Nicol Park has a toddlers park, a skate park and two basketball courts. Bourtree Park has a football pitch and a few swings and climbing frames. There are currently plans to create a new "green area"/park in the north end of Portlethen. There are also several small parks containing swings and climbing frames throughout Portlethen.

There is an integrated community library and community centre located within Portlethen Academy. The Social Work offices of Aberdeenshire Council for the local area are located within Portlethen.

Education 
There has been a school in Portlethen since the nineteenth century. The original school building is still in use today as the local police station.
The school was then moved to new buildings on Cookston Road in 1860.
In 1962, a new school block was opened directly across from the old buildings on Cookston Road. This is now Portlethen Primary School.  There are currently plans to refurbish the Portlethen Primary School building.

In 1987, Portlethen Academy was opened. The academy moved to its current new building, adjacent to the original building, in 2006. In 1989, Fishermoss School, the second primary school in Portlethen, opened its doors. Construction of a third school for Portlethen, Hillside Primary School, started in spring 2016 and the new school opened in March 2017; Which is to be extended as it is already at capacity

Transportation 
Portlethen was bypassed to the west by the A92, formerly the A90, in 1981.

Train 

There is an hourly stopping service between Montrose and Inverurie. At peak times, some services operate to and from further away destinations.

Bus 
Portlethen is connected by direct bus routes to Aberdeen in the north, and Newtonhill and Stonehaven in the south. Buses are operated by Stagecoach Bluebird. The X7 Coastrider only stops on the A92 while other services call at various stops within Portlethen.

Community Council 
The Portlethen & District Community Council (PDCC) was officially reformed on 30 November 2007. It meets monthly in Portlethen Academy, normally on the fourth Tuesday of each month and considers many issues including development proposals and transport.  Meetings are open to the public and offer an opportunity to raise topics of relevance to the local community.

The community council is currently in abeyance due to a lack of volunteers. 

Portlethen Gala is a social and community event held every summer on the last Saturday in August.

Notable people 
Barry Jones, a magician featured on the 2010 TV Series The Magicians, is originally from Portlethen.
Lesley McKay, a drama teacher at Portlethen Academy, was a in-vision continuity announcer on Grampian TV in the 1980s and 90s under the name Kay Duncan.

See also 
 Bishops' Wars
 Craigmaroinn
 Mounth
 Portlethen Moss

Gallery

References

External links 

Portlethen & District Community Council Website

 
Towns in Aberdeenshire